WZQK is a radio station licensed to Flowood, Mississippi.

From November 9, 1992 until September 30, 2020, the station's call sign was WPBQ. Its previous format was urban variety, a blend of contemporary hip-hop, urban gospel, and even some regional Mexican.

On October 9, 2020, WZQK debuted with classic country.

On July 12, 2021, WZQK began simulcasting WJMF-LP, in preparation for WJMF-LP's inevitable demise.

Since July 14, 2021, WZQK's format has been classic hits.

History
The station went on the air in 1996 as WPBQ. It was sold by its original owners, PBD Corporation, to TalkQ Corporation in 2003 for $42,500. TalkQ owned the station until selling to the present licensees in 2016.

References

External links

ZQK
Radio stations established in 1997
1997 establishments in Mississippi
Classic hits radio stations in the United States